Hello, Good Friend is The Rocket Summer's second full-length album, released in 2005. It reached #26 on the Top Heatseekers Chart. The title of the album is from the track "Never Knew".

Track listing
 Move to the Other Side of the Block (1:28)
 I Was So Alone (2:35)
 Around The Clock (3:59)
 I'm Doing Everything (For You) (4:27)
 Tell Me Something Good (3:52)
 Never Knew (4:17)
 Brat Pack (3:47)
 Treasures (2:09)
 Story (4:16)
 Goodbye Waves and Driveways (5:05)
 Show Me Everything You've Got (4:46)
 Destiny (3:51)
 Christmas Present/Good News (Hidden Track) (11:46)

Charts

2005 albums
The Rocket Summer albums